The 1898 season in Swedish football, starting January 1898 and ending December 1898:

Honours

Official titles

Competitions

Domestic results

Svenska Mästerskapet 1898 
Final

References 
Print

Online

 
Seasons in Swedish football